"Black Sheep" is a song by Gin Wigmore from her album Gravel & Wine.  It was released as a single on 26 September 2011.

Charts

Music video
A music video for "Black Sheep" was released on 12 October 2011.

Use in popular culture
The song appeared in episode 12, season 8 of television series Grey's Anatomy, in episode 2, season 2 of Teen Wolf, and in episode 5, season 5 of The Good Wife, and she appeared singing it on Gift of Revenge, a segment of ABC's television show Revenge in season 2, episode 7. Wigmore performed the song on a season 10 episode of The Ellen DeGeneres Show.  A snippet of the song was used for the trailer of the movie The Other Woman. The song was also used in a trailer for season 2 of Orange Is the New Black. The song was used in a 2017 commercial for the Nissan Rogue.

It was also used in the 2018 video game "Far Cry 5".

References

Gin Wigmore songs
2011 singles
Songs written by Butch Walker
Universal Music Group singles
2011 songs